The Mure Baronetcy, of Rowallan was a baronetcy created on 4 May 1662 in the Baronetage of Nova Scotia for Patrick Mure, a younger son of Sir William Mure. The title became extinct upon the death of the first baronet in 1700.

Mure baronets, of Rowallan (1662)
Sir Patrick Mure, 1st Baronet (1622–1700)

References

1662 establishments in Scotland
Mure
Mure